Izumi Nakamitsu (中満 泉 Nakamitsu Izumi; born 1963) is a United Nations Under-Secretary-General of Disarmament Affairs from March 29, 2017 appointed by United Nations Secretary-General António Guterres. She succeeded Kim Won-soo of the Republic of Korea. Prior to this, she served as the Assistant Secretary-General, Assistant Administrator, and Crisis Response Unit leader of the United Nations Development Programme.

Nakamitsu began her career with the United Nations in 2008, and during that time has held several high-level positions with the Organization. From 2016 to 2017, she was the Special Adviser Ad Interim on Follow-up to the Summit on Addressing Large Movements of Refugees and Migrants. Previous to this, she held the position of Director in the Department of Peacekeeping Operations.

Education
Nakamitsu holds a Bachelor of Laws from Waseda University and a Master of Science in Foreign Service from Georgetown University.

Career
Nakamitsu, a Japanese national, has had a distinguished career and has held positions both within and outside the United Nations. 
 Before 1998: held positions with the United Nations at both headquarters and on the field (UN Reform Team of former Secretary-General Kofi Annan, office of UNHCR Assistant High Commissioner for Policy and operations, and UNHCR field operations in (former) Yugoslavia, Turkey, and northern Iraq.
 1998-2004: Chef de Cabinet and Director of Planning and Coordination at International Institute for Democracy and Electoral Assistance (international IDEA) in Stockholm.
 2005-2008: She taught International Relations at Hitotsubashi University in Tokyo while also serving as an advisor to the Japanese Foreign Minister and at the Japan International Cooperation Agency
 2008-2012: She held the position of Director in the United Nations Department of Peacekeeping Operations

In addition to her role as Assistant Secretary-General, United Nations Secretary-General Ban Ki-moon also appointed her as Special Adviser ad interim on Follow-up to the Summit on Addressing Large Movements of Refugees and Migrants in 2016; in this capacity, Nakamitsu succeeded Karen AbuZayd.

In March 2017, Nakamitsu was appointed as the next Under-Secretary-General and High Representative for Disarmament Affairs, Office for Disarmament Affairs.

Other activities 
Nakamitsu is a member of the International Gender Champions (IGC) network, which advocates for gender equality, including in international organizations.

References

External links
 Report by Izumi Nakamitsu on the situation in Syria to the UN Security Council on February 5, 2018
 Statement by Izumi Nakamitsu on the award of the Nobel Peace Prize to ICAN on October 6, 2017

Japanese officials of the United Nations
Living people
1963 births